Ma Yuan (14 BC – 49 AD), courtesy name Wenyuan, also known by his official title Fubo Jiangjun (伏波将军; "General who Calms the Waves"), was a Chinese military general and politician of the Eastern Han dynasty. He played a prominent role in defeating the Trung sisters' rebellion. He was a descendant of the Warring States period general Zhao She.

Life and career

Ma Yuan was a native of what is now Xingping, Shaanxi province.  His family was descended from the State of Zhao. His military and political achievements included helping Emperor Guangwu unite the empire and putting down rebellions of the Trung Sisters (in Jiaozhi, modern Vietnam) and the Wulin tribes (in modern eastern Guizhou and northwestern Hunan). He fell ill during an expedition to modern Hunan in 49 AD, and died soon afterwards. Prior to that, Ma Yuan contributed to Emperor Guangwu's defeat of the warlord Wei Xiao, who controlled the modern eastern Gansu region.

He is considered one of the more famous generals in Chinese history, not only because of his military achievements, but also because he demonstrated perseverance and respect to his friends and subordinates. In addition to his military skills, his exhortations on personal discipline were also highly regarded. His daughter became Empress Ma of Emperor Ming of Han and was also highly respected.

One of his greatest achievements was the subjugation of the territory of the Nanman regions. It was for this he earned his title "Queller of the Deep." He was reportedly revered in that area (as was often the case of great warriors of that period), and his temple was established somewhere there. The territory he subjugated corresponds roughly with North Vietnam.

Ma was placed in command of the campaign to suppress the Trung sisters' rebellion. He was given the title Fubo Jiangjun (伏波將軍; General who Calms the Waves). Ma Yuan and his staff began mobilizing a Han army in southern China. It comprised about 10,000 troops. From Guangdong, Ma Yuan dispatched a fleet of supply ships along the coast. He led the Han army through difficult terrain towards the Red River Delta, where they arrived in early 43 AD. The rebellion was brought under control by April or May.

He also subjugated the Qiang. In 34 A.D., the Xianlian Qiang and a number of other tribes, raided Chinese positions in Jincheng and Longxi commanderies and were defeated by Han armies. A few months later, Lai Xi was killed on campaign against Gongsun Shu, but his assistant, Ma Yuan, Grand Administrator of Lonxi commandery, continued operations against the Qiang. In 35, the Xianlian tribe were again defeated, first at Lintao in Longxi and then along the Xining river in Jincheng commandery. In the two separate campaigns, Ma Yuan captured more than ten thousand head of horses, cattle and sheep, together with considerable stores of grain. He was wounded in the leg during one of the final engagements, and he did not completely destroy the enemy, but he did drive them away from the valley lands of Jincheng, and he was rewarded with Imperial commendation and several thousand of the animals he had captured.

Though members of the Qiang had escaped across the borders, Ma Yuan's victories in 35 had broken the power of the Xianlian tribe and had made possible a restoration of Chinese positions on the old frontiers.

In 49, Ma, while on expedition against the Wulin tribes (in modern eastern Guizhou and northwestern Hunan), died during the campaign from a plague, which also killed a large number of his soldiers. After his death, Ma's deputy Geng Shu, who had disagreed with Ma's strategy, and Emperor Guangwu's son-in-law Liang Song, who had prior grudges against Ma, falsely accused Ma of many crimes. Two specific accusations that are known are that Ma, by the route he took against the Wulin tribes, was responsible for the plague, and that he had, while on campaigns, embezzled pearls and rhinoceros horns. The latter accusation was a misunderstanding in that one of Ma's favorite foods (which he considered capable of warding off plague) was Chinese pearl barley, produced in southern China and northern Vietnam, which Ma had transported in large quantities back to the capital Luoyang. Emperor Guangwu believed these false accusations and posthumously stripped Ma of his fief and title of marquess. His reputation was not restored until his daughter later became empress to Emperor Guangwu's son Emperor Ming upon his ascension to the throne in 57.

Legends
It is said that during Zhuge Liang's attempts to suppress Meng Huo and the barbarians, he was inspired by a statue of Ma Yuan which helped him to overcome one of Meng Huo's most difficult obstacles.

Ma Yuan was the source of two Chinese chengyu idioms. One, "wrapping one's body with horse leather", refers to being dedicated to one's responsibilities that one is willing to die on the battlefield and have his body be wrapped in horse leather; Ma had given this phrase while talking to a friend as to why he wished to continue in military service. The other, "drawing a tiger improperly results in a dog", refers to his admonition to his nephews to be careful in their conduct and not to try to imitate a famed heroic figure of the time, Du Bao -- in that if one tried to imitate Du but was not as heroic as he was, one would end up becoming a frivolous hoodlum.

Memorials

Ma Yuan is worshipped as a deity in numerous temples in China and Vietnam.  The Fubo Temples of Zhuzhou County, Hunan and Heng County, Guangxi are among the best known. Mount Fubo and Fubo Park in Guilin, Guangxi are also named after him.

In Hanoi there is a Ma Yuan temple names Bạch Mã đền was built and worshipped at least since the Han dynasty. The worshipping stopped at the temple when the Sino-Vietnamese War broke out in 1979; historians believe that it was local Kinh tradition until the government abolished it due to tensions with China. As late as 1984, the Hanoi Department of Culture reported the existence of a statue to Ma Yuan in the temple. Similar temples to the Han dynasty general also existed in Cổ Loa, Thanh Hóa Province, Phú Yên Province, and Bắc Ninh Province during the 19th and 20th centuries. A 1938 report from a village in Bắc Ninh described worship of Ma Yuan in addition to their worship of the Trưng sisters as their main guardian. In southern Vietnam, temples dedicated to Ma Yuan were largely located in Chinese temples or areas associated with Vietnamese communities of Chinese descent. The practice of worshipping Ma Yuan was believed to have been brought by Chinese immigrants, but historian Li Tana expressed the "strong possibility that the story was the other way around - that the Chinese adopted the Ma Yuan cult from the Vietnamese" because the worship of Ma Yuan as a local deity was already widespread in Vietnam and because Ma Yuan was called a bản thổ công ("local spirit").

References

14 BC births
49 deaths
Deified Chinese people
Han dynasty generals from Shaanxi
Han dynasty politicians from Shaanxi
Emperor Guangwu of Han
Politicians from Xianyang
Trưng sisters